Archibald Riddell may refer to:
 Archibald Riddell (politician)
 Archibald Riddell (minister)